Yuelu District is one of six urban districts of the prefecture-level city of Changsha, the capital of Hunan Province, China. It is the 4th most populous district (after Heshan, Dingcheng and Yueyanglou Districts) in Hunan. The district is bordered to the north by Wangcheng District, to the west by Ningxiang County, to the south by Yuhu District of Xiangtan City, across the Xiang river to the west by Tianxin, Furong and Kaifu Districts. The district has 16 subdistricts and 2 towns under its jurisdiction, its administrative centre is at Wangyue.

History 
Yuelu District is one of five districts established on 22 April 1996 as a result of adjusting the administrative districts of Changsha. It covers most of the historic West District, including South Lushan Road, Yinpenling, Juzizhou and Wangyuehu four subdistricts, Yuelushan Township and Wangyue Township of the historic Jiaoqu, Tianding Township of the historic Wangcheng County.

Yuelu is an important district that is a cultural area and has a long history and profound cultural deposit in Changsha, the Yuelu Academy (later become Hunan University) founded in 976 (the 9th year of the reign of the Song Dynasty) is on the east side of Yuelu Mountain, in the south is the University Town Zone where there are many universities including Central South University, Hunan University, Hunan Normal University, Hunan First Normal University, Hunan University of Technology and Commerce, and Hunan University of Chinese Medicine. The Changsha High-Tech Industrial Development Zone covers large area in the middle of the district.

Subdivisions
According to the Programme of adjustment of township-level administrative divisions of Yuelu District on November 19, 2015, Yuelu has 16 subdistricts and 2 towns under its jurisdictions.

16 subdistricts
 Guanshaling
 Hanpu Subdistrict
 Juzizhou
 Lugu Subdistrict
 Meixihu
 Pingtang Subdistrict
 Tianding
 Wangchengpo
 Wangyuehu
 Wangyue
 Xihu
 Xianjiahu
 Xueshi
 Yanghu
 Yinpenling
 Yuelu subdistrict

2 towns
 Lianhua, Changsha
 Yuchangping

Economy
According to preliminary accounting of the statistical authority, the gross domestic product of Yuelu District in 2017 was 101,671 million yuan (15,058 million US dollars), up by 9.2 percent over the previous year. Of this total, the value added of the primary industry was 1,862 million yuan (276 million US dollars), up by 6.6 percent, that of the secondary industry was 42,831 million yuan (6,344 million US dollars), up by 9.2 percent and that of the tertiary industry was 56,978 million yuan (8,439 million US dollars), up by 9.8 percent. The value added of the primary industry accounted for 1.83 percent of the GDP; that of the secondary industry accounted for 42.13 percent; and that of the tertiary industry accounted for 56.04 percent. The per capita GDP by the population of mid-year permanent residents in 2017 was 120,499 yuan (17,847 US dollars).

References

 
Districts of Changsha